Fritz Berolzheimer, Juris Doctor (3 January 1869 – 30 September 1920) was a German philosopher of law. He was the author of the five volume System der Rechts- und Wirtschaftsphilosophie (1904–07). In 1907 he co-founded the Archiv für Rechts- und Wirtschaftsphilosophie (ARWP).

Principal works 
 Rechtsphilosophische Studien (Munich, 1903)
 Die Entgeltung im Strafrecht (Munich, 1903)
 System der Rechts- und Wirtschaftsphilosophie (Munich, 1904–07)
 Volume 1. Kritik des Erkenntnisinhaltes (Munich, 1904)
 Volume 2. Die Kulturstufen der Rechts- und Wirtschaftsphilosophie (Munich, 1905)
 Volume 3. Philosophie des Staates samt den Grundzügen der Politik (Munich, 1906)
 Volume 4. Philosophie des Vermögens einschliesslich des Handelsverkehrs (Munich, 1907)
 Volume 5. Strafrechtsphilosophie und Strafrechtsreform (Munich, 1907)
 Deutschland von Heute (Berlin, 1909)
 Die Gefahren einer Gefühlsjurisprudenz in der Gegenwart (Berlin, 1911)
 The World's Legal Philosophies (Modern Legal Philosophy Series, Vol. 2), Lawbook Exchange Ltd 2002,

Berolzheimer texts online

References 

1869 births
1920 deaths
German political philosophers
German philosophers
Philosophers of law
German male writers